The Best Things – The Greatest Hits is the first greatest hits released by Australian rock band Boom Crash Opera. The album was released in August 1998  and includes tracks from all of Boom Crash Opera's five studio albums as well as non-album single "Soundtrack" and unreleased track "Radio".

Track listing 
 "Great Wall" (Dale Ryder, Richard Pleasance) – 3:47
 "Hands Up in the Air" (Peter Farnan, Richard Pleasance) – 3:57
 "City Flat" (Peter Farnan, Richard Pleasance) – 4:1
 "Her Charity" (Peter Farnan, Richard Pleasance) – 5:02
 "Onion Skin" (Peter Farnan) – 3:30
 "Get Out of the House!" (Greg O'Connor, Dale Ryder, Peter Farnan; Peter Maslen, Richard Pleasance) – 3:21
 "The Best Thing" (Richard Pleasance) – 4:15
 "Dancing in the Storm" (Richard Pleasance, Peter Farnan) – 4:15
 "Bettadaze" (Peter Farnan, Greg O'Connor, Dale Ryder) – 3:59
 "In the Morning" (Peter Farnan, Greg O'Connor) – 3:59
 "This Isn't Love" (Dale Ryder) – 3:33
 "Gimme" (Ian Tilley, Peter Farnan) – 3:37
 "Soundtrack" (Peter Farnan) – 4:48
 "Radio" (Dale Ryder) – 3:45
 "All" (Peter Farnan, Peter Maslen, Ian Tilley) – 4:15
 "Welcome to Tomorrow" (Peter Farnan) – 8:58

References 

1998 greatest hits albums
Boom Crash Opera albums
Bertelsmann Music Group compilation albums
Compilation albums by Australian artists